Paul J. Widowitz (October 8, 1917 – October 29, 2007) was an American professional basketball player. He played for the Cleveland Allmen Transfers in the National Basketball League during the 1945–46 season and averaged 7.1 points per game. He also played in other semi-professional leagues.

References

1917 births
2007 deaths
All-American college men's basketball players
American men's basketball players
Basketball players from Pittsburgh
Cleveland Allmen Transfers players
Duquesne Dukes men's basketball players
Forwards (basketball)